Zapatero  is a Spanish-language occupational surname literally meaning "shoemaker".

José Luis Rodríguez Zapatero (born 1960), Prime Minister of Spain from 2004 to 2011.
Carlos Arroyo Zapatero (born 1964), Spanish architect.
José Ignacio Zapatero (born 1971), Spanish rugby union player.
Ismael Piñera Zapatero (born 1971), Spanish soccer player.

Occupational surnames
Spanish-language surnames